The 2009–10 season covers the period from 1 July 2009 to 30 June 2010 and was the club's 101st season, having been founded as Dundee Hibernian in 1909.

Review and events
A number of players joined and left the club in early pre-season. Striker Danny Cadamarteri signed on a Bosman transfer from Huddersfield Town, while goalkeeper Steve Banks arrived as player/goalkeeping coach after negotiating his release from Hearts. Former England under-18 cap Jennison Myrie-Williams arrived after leaving Bristol City while Michael McGovern, who had been signed as back-up on a one-year deal last summer, left the club after failing to make a first-team appearance. Warren Feeney's loan spell also came to an end and wasn't renewed, while a handful of under-19 players were either released or allowed to move to lower league clubs.

Chronological list of events
This is a list of the significant events to occur at the club during the 2009–10 season, presented in chronological order. This list does not include transfers, which are listed in the transfers section below, or match results, which are in the results section.

 7 July: Francisco Sandaza's double hernia rules him out until September.
 21 July: Prince Buaben is diagnosed with malaria following a visit to his native Ghana.
 27 July: New signing Damián Casalinuovo becomes the fourth striker to suffer injury after dislocating his shoulder during the final tour match in Ireland.
 10 September: Danny Cadamarteri is named Player of the Month for August 2009.
 12 September: The club's centenary dinner takes place.
 6 October: Scott Robertson is named as a replacement in the Scotland squad for the upcoming friendly in Japan; hours later, he is replaced himself by teammate Craig Conway.
 23 December: Manager Craig Levein leaves the club to become Scotland manager, with Peter Houston placed in temporary charge.
 8 January: The deal to bring Bohemians manager Pat Fenlon to Tannadice falls through after both clubs failed to agree on a compensation deal.
 28 January: Peter Houston is confirmed as the club's manager until the end of the season.
 28 January: Jon Daly scores the club's 5,000th league goal with a penalty in the 4–4 draw at Kilmarnock.
 15 May: Dundee United F.C. win the Scottish Cup for only the second time. Goodwillie scored the first from 25 yards and Craig Conway scored a double. United won 3–0 against Ross County.

Match results
Dundee United have played twelve competitive matches during the 2009–10 season.

Friendlies
The club failed to retain the Keyline Cup they won last year by finishing third in the six-team tournament when they visited Oban in mid July. A series of domestic friendly matches sandwiched a trip to the Republic of Ireland before the club's centenary friendly draw at home to Newcastle United. A friendly win at home to FA Premier League side Blackburn Rovers was the club's last pre-season encounter, although in late July, the club confirmed a November friendly with rivals Dundee to mark the opening of the club's new floodlights. United ran out 3-1 winners with goals from Andis Shala, Danny Cadamarteri and Jon Daly.

Scottish Premier League

The 2009–10 Scottish Premier League season began on Saturday 15 August 2009 with United featuring in the first live SPL match on ESPN two days later, beating Heart of Midlothian. United failed to make it two wins from the opening two matches – last achieved in the 1992-93 season – when they were held to a goalless draw at St Mirren, although they followed up with a 2–1 win at home to Falkirk a week later. The first weekend in September saw an international break with United coming close to ending their seventeen-year wait for a victory at Celtic Park, drawing 1-1. The following week, United's unbeaten start to the season ended when Motherwell won 1–0 at Tannadice, although United responded with an away win against St Johnstone. Successive draws against Hibernian and Hamilton Academical followed before United won the first New Firm derby of the season. At the start of November, United's televised match at home to Rangers was abandoned at half-time due to torrential rain, with Rangers leading 1–0. In United's next match, two Damian Casalinuovo goals saw off Kilmarnock at Rugby Park, for the club's second successive away win; on 22 November, at the 39th time of asking, United finally defeated Celtic in a league match, winning 2–1. United continued their unbeaten run with a hard-fought 2–2 draw away to Motherwell, despite having two players sent off, and followed up with a home win against St Mirren. A 0–0 draw at Hearts preceded a defeat at home to Rangers, in what turned out to be Craig Levein's final match, before another 0–0 draw at home to Kilmarnock. United finally scored in the following match but incredibly lost 7–1 at Rangers, with Kris Boyd scoring a quintuple against United for the second time in his career. A further defeat to Aberdeen followed before a three-game winning streak against Hamilton, Hibernian and Falkirk. St Johnstone were the visitors to Tannadice in a 3–3 draw to close out January. United started February with a pulsating 4–4 draw at Kilmarnock, before a shock defeat at home to Hamilton. A further defeat at Celtic Park followed before a Morgaro Gomis double helped United to three points at home to basement club Falkirk.

Scottish Cup

Dundee United played Partick Thistle in the Scottish Cup Fourth Round on Saturday 9 January 2010, winning 2–0. The fifth round draw gave United another away tie – against St Johnstone – for five consecutive cup ties this season. United gained revenge for the McDiarmid Park defeat in the League Cup, winning 1-0 before being drawn away again, this time to Rangers. After forcing a replay at Tannadice, they saw off Raith Rovers to proceed to the final at Hampden. A pair of goals from Craig Conway in the final against Ross County ensured Dundee United's first Scottish Cup title since 1994. The Ross County game had the most Arabs ever at one match.

League Cup

Dundee United joined the League Cup 2009-10 campaign in the second round where they beat Alloa Athletic. United won at Ross County in the third round to progress to the quarter-finals, where they were handed a third successive away tie, losing to fellow SPL side St Johnstone.

Player stats
During the 2009–10 season, United have used 29 different players on the pitch. The table below shows the number of appearances and goals scored by each player.

|}

Team statistics

League table

Transfers

In
The club confirmed the pre-contract signings of three players in June, with Slovakian goalkeeper Dušan Perniš to follow in January. Scotland international Andy Webster followed on a season-long loan deal - some eight years after nearly signing from Arbroath, and former Manchester City goalkeeper Nicky Weaver signing on a short-term contract. In late September 2009, midfielder Mark Fotheringham was signed on a three-month contract ahead of his January 2010 move to Anorthosis Famagusta. In February, Latvian defender Pāvels Mihadjuks signed a short-term deal until the end of the season.

Out
Youngster Ross McCord joined Stirling Albion on loan (where older brother Ryan had a previous loan spell), while Danny Grainger joined rivals St Johnstone. In late August, Damián Casalinuovo joined Raith Rovers on a month's loan deal, with Johnny Russell following suit upon the Argentine's return. Marco Andreoni and Conor Grant joined Forfar Athletic on short-term emergency loans in October, with Greg Cameron and Kevin Smith joining Raith on a similar deal. In December, Keith Watson also undertook a temporary move to Fife, joining East Fife.

Awards
The club has received three awards during the 2009–10 season, with Craig Levein winning Manager of the Month, and Danny Cadamarteri and Andy Webster winning Player of the Month.

Manager of the Month
 Craig Levein: 1
  November 2009
 Peter Houston: 1
  April 2010

Player of the Month
 Danny Cadamarteri: 1
 September 2009
 Andy Webster: 1
 November 2009

Playing kit

The jerseys were sponsored for a second season by JD Sports' Carbrini Sportswear label, with the firm also sponsoring the shorts. Nike began their four-year deal of kit production with the club's centenary home strip unveiled in mid-June, with the away strip to follow on 24 July. Dundee-based cosmetic car repair specialists Dents8 began a two-year sponsorship of the home and away shorts and the first team's socks.

The club has a third strip, a centenary strip, to mark the club's foundation in 1909. Previously, the last third strip used was in the 2002–03 season. The strip was used in the November 2009 friendly against Dundee but remains unused in competitive competition.

See also
 2009–10 Scottish Premier League
 2009–10 Scottish Cup
 2009–10 Scottish League Cup
 2009–10 in Scottish football

References

External links
 Official site: 2009/10 Fixtures
 BBC - Club stats
 Soccerbase - Results  | Squad stats | Transfers

Dundee United F.C. seasons
Dundee United